Pushkara Mallikarjunaiah is an Indian producer best known for his Kannada films. His debut film Godhi Banna Sadharana Mykattu was a blockbuster hit which was released in 2016 followed by another collaboration with actor and producer Rakshit Shetty in Kirik Party which is now all-time top three hit movies in Kannada. He co-produced the multiple award-winning Kannada film Jeerjimbe.

Early life
Pushkara Mallikarjunaiah was born on 11 September 1980 to K.N Mallikarjunaiah and Manjula Devi B.S in, a Koratagere town in Tumkur district, Karnataka. Pushkar graduated with a Bachelor of Engineering degree in Mechanical from M S Ramaiah Institute of Technology in 2003 and further pursued his M.S. in Automotive (UK) from the University of Hertfordshire from United Kingdom in 2005. Later worked as a SAP consultant for few years and quit his job to live his dream as an entrepreneur. He then started his construction business from the year 2009. His film journey started in the year 2016 with a blockbuster hit Godhi Banna Sadharana Mykattu.

Career 
Pushkar's debut production Godhi Banna Sadharana Mykattu which was directed by Hemanth Rao, starring Anant Nag and Rakshit Shetty produced under his banner Pushkar Films went on to become a blockbuster hit. The movie is amongst the all-time top 3 highest grossing Kannada movie in terms of overseas collection. It stands at 4th position in terms of number of shows played at Karnataka Multiplexes.

His next project was Kirik Party, where he bought a stake of 30% under his banner Pushkar Films was yet another blockbuster. The film was released in 2016, this movie created a history of becoming 2nd highest profitable movie in Kannada cinema with a near turnover of more than 40 crores and the movie is still running in theaters heading towards completing its 100 days run. Pushkara Mallikarjunaiah's upcoming production venture is titled as Humble Politician Nograj starring Danish Sait. Produced under his banner Pushkar films in association with Rakshit Shetty’s Paramvah Studios, this movie is expected to be released in August 2017.

Pushkar received the Bengaluru International Film Festival award during February 2017 for his debut production film Godhi Banna Sadharna Mykattu as the 3rd best Kannada cinema.

Filmography

Awards

References

External links
 

Film producers from Bangalore
Living people
Kannada film producers
1980 births